Astatine bromide is an interhalogen compound with the chemical formula AtBr.

Production

Astatine bromide is produced by the reaction of astatine with an aqueous solution of iodine monobromide:
2 At + 2 IBr → 2 AtBr + I2
Astatine bromide also can produce by reacting elemental astatine and bromine:
2 At+Br2→2 AtBr

References

Bibliography
 

Interhalogen compounds
Diatomic molecules
Astatine compounds
Bromides